Jane Warton may refer to

Jane Warton (writer) (1724–1809), British writer
Lady Constance Bulwer-Lytton (1869–1923), British suffragist who used "Jane Warton" as an alias